The 1972–73 Norwegian 1. Divisjon season was the 34th season of ice hockey in Norway. Eight teams participated in the league, and Valerenga Ishockey won the championship.

First round

Second round

Final round

Relegation round

External links 
 Norwegian Ice Hockey Federation

Nor
GET-ligaen seasons
1972 in Norwegian sport
1973 in Norwegian sport